Subir Sen (24 July 1934 – 29 December 2015) was an Indian playback singer who sang modern songs in Bengali and Hindi. He was also one of the artists of Rabindra Sangeet.

Personal life 
Sen was born in Dibrugarh, Assam to Sailesh Chandra Sen and Lily Sen. Sailesh was a doctor. They also had a pharmacy in Guwahati. His siblings were Prithwish Sen, Gauri Sen, Sunil Sen and Arun Sen. He passed the Matric Examination from Guwahati and came to Kolkata in pursuit of music. He was married to Roma Sen.

Career in Music 
Music interested Subir Sen from a young age. During his schooling, he attended a classical vocal music competition at Morris College, Lucknow. He secured first place and received his award from Pandit Shrikrishna Ratanjankar. In 1951, he came to Kolkata and was admitted to Ashutosh College. While in Kolkata, he started taking music lessons from Pandit Chinmoy Lahiri, who sent Sen to Shri Usha Ranjan Mukherjee to learn thumri.

While he was studying in Ashutosh College he took part in the KEREJU Music Competition conducted by HMV, and he was selected as first among around fourteen hundred competitors. Subir Sen described this event in his own words in "আমি তো গেয়েছি সেই গান", where he sang a song composed by his mentor Sri Anupam Ghatak: সারা রাত জ্বলে সন্ধ্যাপ্রদীপ.

Sen's first record was released by Columbia records in February 1954 and contained two Bengali modern songs whose music was composed by Sri Chitto Roy and lyrics written by Sri Shyamal Gupta: 'জীবন-বাতি নিভিয়ে যেদিন' and 'আর কত জানাব তোমায়'. Subir Sen was invited to Mumbai by Guru Dutt. Sudhin Sengupta too was invited by Guru Dutt to work for his production house. For some time, Subir Sen and Sudhin Dasgupta stayed together in Tardeo Sonawala building in Mumbai when Sudhin composed a song "এত সুর আর এত গান" (Eto sur aar eto gaan), which was recorded by Subir Sen much later. The second record of Subir Sen appeared in 1956 and contained two compositions of Sudhin Dasgupta, 'ঐ উজ্জ্বল দিন ডাকে স্বপ্ন রঙ্গীন' and 'স্বর্ণঝরা সূর্যরঙে'.  It was this record of Subir Sen that made him famous and gave Subir Sen a permanent place in the world of Bengali music.

While in Mumbai, Subir Sen was scouted by Shankar-Jaikishan, the famous music composer-duo and was inducted to the Mumbai film industry. In Om Prakash's first production, "Aas Ki Panchhi" (1956) starring Rajendra Kumar, Subir Sen sang the title song through the lip of the hero riding on a bicycle leading a team of NCC cadets: "Dil mera ek aas ka panchhi, udta hai oonche gagan par." Subir Sen also lent his voice to various Hindi movies such as Chhoti Bahen (1959), Boy Friend (1961) and Passport (1961). He was associated with Salil Chowdhury, Sudhin Dasgupta, Abhijit Bandopadhyay, Anal Chatterjee, Amiyo Dasgupta and many other noted music composers of Calcutta (Kolkata) and Bombay (Mumbai) that time.

In 1967, Subir Sen debuted as a music director when composing music for Bengali film মিস প্রিয়ম্বদা (Miss Priyambada). In 1972, he was music director for the Hindi film "Midnight." The film, directed by Raju, was released in England in 1972. Playback songs were: Koi mera ho gaya (Subir Sen), London ke mele mein & Zindagi Ka Hai Yeh Fasana (Md. Rafi), Tumsa meet mila (Geeta Dutt and Talat Mahmood), and Tere yad mein sajan (Geeta Dutt).

Subir Sen acted in several movies in Bengali and Hindi. He was an actor-singer in Bengali movies Momer Alo (1964) (with Uttam Kumar) and Anubhav (with Sanjeev Kumar). He was offered the lead role in the Hindi movie Abhiman by Hrishikesh Mukherjee and when Subir Sen declined, it was given to Amitabh Bachhan.

Subir Sen's literary contributions are rare and difficult to retrieve, but his writings' spontaneity may be observed in a chapter of a book titled Shyamal Mitra – a compilation of essays, a memoir of Shyamal Mitra.

Awards 
 2007 – Harmonica Sangeet Samman – Lifetime achievement award.
 2012 – Sangeet Maha Samman by Government of West Bengal
 2013 – "Banga Bibhushan" by the Government of West Bengal.

Death and legacy
Survived by his daughter (Supriya Sen, presently a professor in occupational therapy at Virginia Commonwealth University), he died of lung cancer in Kolkata, West Bengal, India, at 8 a.m. on 29 December 2015. Subir Sen had a deep, dreamy, romantic and appealing voice. His renditions of Rabindra Sangeet, Hindi film songs, and Bangla modern songs were popular and represented a genre of its own kind. Sen was fond of Western music, particularly of Jim Reeves and Nat King Cole. According to Abhijit Bandopadhyay, he created an international style of his own. 

Runa Laila, a notable Bangladeshi singer, was one of Sen's nieces.

Discography 
Film and Non-film songs of Subir Sen

Rabindra Sangeet by Subir Sen

References 

2015 deaths
Bengali playback singers
Singers from Kolkata
Indian male playback singers
20th-century Indian singers
21st-century Indian singers
20th-century Indian male singers
1934 births
21st-century Indian male singers